Albert Arthur Yates (May 26, 1945 – November 23, 2007) was an American professional baseball player who appeared in 24 games in Major League Baseball for the Milwaukee Brewers in the  season, primarily as an outfielder.

Early years
Raised in Bogota, New Jersey, Yates attended Bogota High School. He was signed by the New York Mets in 1964 as an amateur free agent out of Bloomsburg University of Pennsylvania. He played in the New York–Penn League for the Auburn Mets during two seasons (1964–1965). As a big leaguer with the 1971 Brewers, he collected 24 hits, including two doubles and one home run, a solo shot on June 6 at Milwaukee County Stadium off Dave McNally of the defending world champion Baltimore Orioles.

Yates retired from baseball after the 1971 campaign.

References

External links
, or Retrosheet, or Pura Pelota (Venezuelan Winter League)

1945 births
2007 deaths
Auburn Mets players
Baseball players from Jersey City, New Jersey
Bloomsburg Huskies baseball players
Cocoa Rookie League Mets players
Evansville Triplets players
Florida Instructional League Mets players
Louisville Colonels (minor league) players
Major League Baseball outfielders
Milwaukee Brewers players
Navegantes del Magallanes players
American expatriate baseball players in Venezuela
People from Bogota, New Jersey
Sportspeople from Bergen County, New Jersey
Toronto Maple Leafs (International League) players
Williamsport Mets players